Sylhet can mean:
Sylhet metro, an administrative area (a subdistrict) in central Sylhet
Sylhet city, a city in Bangladesh
Sylhet district, an administrative area around Sylhet
Sylhet division, a region and administrative area around Sylhet
Sylhet region, a region in Bangladesh and India
Sylheti language, the language spoken in and around Sylhet
Sylhetis, the people from the Sylhet region
Sylheti script, a writing system matching the phonology (sound system) of spoken Sylheti